Community is an American comedy television series created by Dan Harmon. The show ran for six seasons and 110 episodes, with its first five seasons airing on NBC from September 17, 2009 to April 17, 2014 and the final season airing on Yahoo! Screen from March 17, 2015 to June 2, 2015. Set at Greendale Community College, the series stars an ensemble cast playing members of a diverse study group. The main cast includes Joel McHale as Jeff Winger, Gillian Jacobs as Britta Perry, Danny Pudi as Abed Nadir, Yvette Nicole Brown as Shirley Bennett, Alison Brie as Annie Edison, Donald Glover as Troy Barnes, Ken Jeong as Ben Chang, Chevy Chase as Pierce Hawthorne, and Jim Rash as Dean Craig Pelton. A comedy about friendships and relationships, the show uses frequent pop culture references and meta-humor, as well as high-concept episodes including documentary spoofs, action movie homages and storylines inspired by movies.

Despite being critically acclaimed and gaining a cult following, the show faced production issues and repeatedly came close to cancellation. The third season was subject to a mid-season replacement, its second half airing months later than originally planned. Harmon was fired as showrunner for the fourth season, though he was rehired by the fifth season. The end of the fourth season and middle of the fifth season saw the departures of Chase and Glover, respectively. The show was cancelled by NBC and moved to Yahoo! Screen for its sixth and final season, which also saw the departure of Brown. Community was effectively cancelled when Yahoo! Screen shut down in 2016.

Over the course of its run, the series was nominated for many awards, including four Primetime Emmy Awards (winning one), ten Critics' Choice Television Awards (winning one), and six Satellite Awards (winning one). Among the main cast, McHale and Pudi were the most nominated individuals with seven nominations each; McHale won two awards and Pudi won one. Several episodes, including "Introduction to Statistics", "Modern Warfare", "Abed's Uncontrollable Christmas", and "Remedial Chaos Theory", received individual nominations for awards. Some commentators have considered the show's relative lack of awards recognition at the Emmys to be a snub.

Awards and nominations

Notes

References

External links 
 

Awards and nominations
Community